Uhlenhorster Hockey-Club e. V. (also known as UHC Hamburg) is a German field hockey and tennis club based in Hamburg. It was founded in 1901, since 1923 their home ground is located in Hummelsbüttel, Wandsbek.

Uhlenhorster HC is one of the most successful clubs in Germany, both at the Senior and Academy levels, with squads playing in the Men's and Women's Bundesligas. The men's side have won the Euro Hockey League three times. Uhlenhorster Hockey Club Academy is one of the leading hockey academies in Europe and has produced a number of international players.

Honours

Men
Bundesliga
 Runners-up (8): 1942–43, 1964–65, 2003–04, 2006–07, 2008–09, 2009–10, 2014–15, 2015–16
Euro Hockey League
 Winners (3): 2007–08, 2009–10, 2011–12
 Runners-up (2): 2008–09, 2014–15
Indoor Bundesliga
 Winners (3): 1963–64, 2001–02, 2017–18
 Runners-up(3): 1962–63, 2010–11, 2011–12
EuroHockey Indoor Club Cup
 Runners-up (1): 2003

Women
Bundesliga
 Winners (6): 1962–63, 2008–09, 2010–11, 2014–15, 2015–16, 2016–17
 Runners-up (11): 1956–57, 1957–58, 1958–59, 1959–60, 1960–61, 1961–62, 2009–10, 2011–12, 2012–13, 2013–14, 2017–18
EuroHockey Club Cup
 Runners-up (3): 2010, 2017, 2018
Indoor Bundesliga
 Winners (2): 2013–14, 2016–17
 Runners-up (2): 1962–63, 2009–10
EuroHockey Indoor Club Cup
 Winners (2): 2015, 2018

Current squad

Men's squad

Notable players

Men's internationals
 
 Florian Fuchs
 Moritz Fürste
 Nicolas Jacobi
 Oliver Korn
 Jan-Philipp Rabente
 
 Germán Orozco
 Matías Paredes
 
 Shea McAleese
 
 Sos Hayrapetyan
 
 Xavier Ribas

Women's internationals
 
 Nicola Evans

Coaches
  Tina Bachmann

References

External links
Official website

 
Field hockey clubs in Germany
Sport in Hamburg
Field hockey clubs established in 1901
1901 establishments in Germany
Wandsbek